Abdul Hamid Hamidi (7 January 1927 – 11 July 2019) was a field hockey player from Pakistan . He was born in Bannu . He scored 48 International goals in just 55 appearances for Pakistan . He won silver medal in 1956 Summer Olympics and gold medal in 1960 Summer Olympics.  

After his retirement from professional competition, he managed the national team on several occasions, including during the 1966 and 1970 Asian Games.  He also served as the secretary general of the Pakistan Hockey Federation.  As of 2017, he lived in Islamabad.

Death 
He died on 11 July 2019, in Combined Military Hospital Rawalpindi, at the age of 92.

Awards and recognition
 Pride of Performance Award for Sports in 1960 by the President of Pakistan

See also
Abdul Hamid II- another Pakistan hockey player with a similar name
 Abdul Rasheed Junior- Abdul Hamid's younger brother. He was also a Pakistan hockey player.

References

External links
 

1927 births
2019 deaths
Pakistani male field hockey players
Olympic field hockey players of Pakistan
Olympic gold medalists for Pakistan
Olympic silver medalists for Pakistan
Field hockey players at the 1948 Summer Olympics
Field hockey players at the 1952 Summer Olympics
Field hockey players at the 1956 Summer Olympics
Field hockey players at the 1960 Summer Olympics
Muhajir people
Recipients of the Pride of Performance
Asian Games medalists in field hockey
Field hockey players at the 1958 Asian Games
Medalists at the 1960 Summer Olympics
Medalists at the 1956 Summer Olympics
Asian Games gold medalists for Pakistan
Medalists at the 1958 Asian Games
Olympic medalists in field hockey